The 1998 Newham London Borough election for the Newham London Borough Council was held on 7 May 1998. The whole council was up for election. Turnout was 28.4%. Labour won every seat for the second time since the councils formation.

Election result

|}

Background
A total of 138 candidates stood in the election for the 60 seats being contested across 24 wards. Candidates included a full slate from the Labour Party, whilst the Conservative Party ran 31 candidates and the Liberal Democrats ran 11 candidates. In both cases this was a lot less than 4 years before. Other candidates running were 8 Socialist Labour, 2 National Democrats, 11 BNP, 1 Monster Raving Looney and 14 Independents.

Results by ward

Beckton

Bemersyde

Canning Town & Grange

Castle

Central

Custom House & Silvertown

Forest Gate

Greatfield

Hudsons

Kensington

Little Ilford

Manor Park

Monega

New Town

Ordnance

Park

Plaistow

Plashet

St Stephens

South

Stratford

Upton

Wall End

West Ham

By-elections between 1998 and 2002

Custom House and Silvertown

The by-election was called following the death of Cllr. William A. Chapman.

Plashet

The by-election was called following the death of Cllr. Harbans S. Jabbal.

Stratford

The by-election was called following the death of Cllr. James G. Newstead.

Custom House and Silvertown

The by-election was called following the resignation of Cllr. Christopher T. Rackley.

Beckton

The by-election was called following the death of Cllr. Maureen Knight.

References

1998
1998 London Borough council elections